NSB Class 69 is an electric multiple unit used by Norwegian State Railways for a variety of commuter trains on the Norwegian railway system, as well as a few medium distance and branch line trains. It is the most common type of trainset in Norway, although the newer NSB Class 72 has also been introduced. All the trains were built by Strømmen.

History
During the 1960s NSB realized that they would need a new generation of electric multiple units for local traffic. Both the Class 65, 67 and 68 had for thirty years been built with slight modifications, and NSB needed both new and more modern trains for their operations. Among the inspiration was the successful X1 units used in Sweden. NSB decided on a number of rationalizations, first of all a new interior so that two new cars could hold the same capacity as three units from the older models. This increase in speed was sufficient to reduce the number of trains for a given frequency by a third. For instance on the line from Oslo East Station to Ski this allowed NSB to reduce the number of operative car from nine to four. The 69-set was also given new thyristor motors with 1,200 kW, a lot more than the old units.

The first units were delivered on 1 November 1970, and the first series fifteen units (A-series) was put into service from Oslo Ø to Lillestrøm and Ski. The B-series was delivered a few years later, and used for longer lines, soon followed by more C-series units. The D-series was delivered in the 1980s and custom made for longer distances. The last series was delivered in 1993 as part of the stock for the 1994 Winter Olympics. All the original units consisted of twin-car sets, but from 1987 NSB ordered additional middle cars, to make three-car units. This allowed somewhat more flexibility, and NSB kept the A- and B-series as twin-cars so they could combine trains to make any number of cars needed between two and nine. The second two batches of D-series trains delivered in 1990 and 1993 were delivered with three cars.

Not until 1982 were the 69-units put into service outside the Oslo area. At first they were tried out on Flåm Line, then in 1984 on the Bergen Commuter Rail. From 1991 they were also used on the Stavanger Commuter Rail. 

The E- and G-series are rebuilt sets, with higher comfort levels, the former in 1994 for Sørlandet Line between Kristiansand and Stavanger, the latter on Gjøvik Line in 2005. 

On 14 December 1999 NSB introduced wrap advertising for Freia Melkesjokolade on three of the trains, but chose to discontinue outside advertisements after a while.

Two will be operated by Go-Ahead Norge from December 2019.

Lines served
The BM69 trainsets are in use between Arendal-Nelaug, and on the L2 line between Stabekk–Ski.

Versions

The BM69 comes in six series:
 The BM69A was the original BM69, built between 1970 and 1971. They consist of two carriages. 15 of these train sets were built and 4 remain in service.
 The BM69B is the second series, built in 1974. Most of the 17 BM69B sets built consist of two carriages, but two of them had a middle carriage added. Some of the B-series trains were rebuilt with a large cargo hold, making them suitable for somewhat longer journeys such as Bergen–Myrdal where skis and bicycles are often brought along. The B-series has only one door on each side of the carriage, rather than two. This allows for extra seating, although it slows the embarkment and disembarkment.
 The BM69C series was built in 1975. They consist of three carriages. The 14 train sets operate commuter trains like the BM69D series.
 The BM69D series were built between 1983 and 1990. They are distinguishable from the BM69C series by the redesigned ends of the train. 39 of these trains were built and 35 remain in service as of 2005.
 The BM69E series are redesigned BM69D trains for use on somewhat longer stretches, for instance, the usual five abreast seating is replaced with four abreast seating. They have been used on the Gjøvik Line and Jæren Line,  Bergen and Voss.
 The BM69G series are another version of redesigned BM69D train sets. They are equipped with several amenities such as food and drink vending machines and more comfortable seating including a first class section. The nine G-series trains were rebuilt in Denmark and operate on the Gjøvik Line.

Specifications

 Weight: 53.5-64 tons
 Power: 1632 hp
 Axle configuration
 Bo'Bo'+2'2' (2 cars)
 Bo'Bo'+2'2'+2'2' (3 cars)
 Maximum speed: 130 km/h

Accidents
 On 20 June 1986, 69.054 burnt up at Lodalen.
 On 26 October 1988, 69.668 collided with El 16.2205 and was later demolished.
 On 16 April 1990, two 69-sets collided at Lysaker, and 69.009 and 69.628 were taken out of service.
 In 1991 and 1992, 69.014 and 69.019, respectively, burnt up.
 After the Nordstrand accident in 1993, 69.068 was retired.

Others taken out of service
No.01, 02(ERTMS test train), 04, 06, 07, 08, 09, 10, 13, 15, 17, 18, 20, 21, 22, 23, 25, 30, 31, 32, 41

References

69
Vehicles introduced in 1971
69
15 kV AC multiple units